Mary Harriman Rumsey (November 17, 1881 – December 18, 1934) was the founder of The Junior League for the Promotion of Settlement Movements, later known as the Junior League of the City of New York of the Association of Junior Leagues International Inc.  Mary was the daughter of railroad magnate E.H. Harriman and sister to W. Averell Harriman, former New York State Governor and United States Diplomat. In 2015 she was posthumously inducted into the National Women's Hall of Fame.

Early life
Mary Harriman Rumsey was born on November 17, 1881, the oldest of six children of railroad industrialist E.H. Harriman (1848–1909) and his wife, Mary Averell Harriman (1851–1932).

Her siblings were Henry Neilson Harriman (1883–1888), Cornelia Harriman (1884–1966), who married Robert Livingston Gerry (1877–1957), Carol Averell Harriman (1889–1948), who married R. Penn Smith in 1917. After his death in 1929, she married W. Plunket Stewart, a racing stable owner in 1930,  William Averell Harriman (1891–1986), who in 1955 became the Governor of New York and who married Kitty Lanier Lawrence, then Marie Norton Whitney (1903–1970), and lastly to Pamela Beryl Digby Churchill Hayward (1920–1997), and Edward Roland Noel Harriman (1895–1978), who married Gladys Fries (1896–1983).

Mary attended Barnard College, where she specialized in sociology and was a member of Kappa Kappa Gamma.

Career

The Junior League 

Inspired by a lecture on the settlement movement, Mary, along with several friends, began volunteering at the College Settlement on Rivington Street in New York City's Lower East Side, a large immigrant enclave.  Through her work at the College Settlement, Mary became convinced that there was more she could do to help others.  Subsequently, Mary and a group of 80 debutantes established the Junior League for the Promotion of Settlement Movements in 1901, while she was still a student at Barnard College.  The purpose of the Junior League would be to unite interested debutantes in joining the Settlement Movement in New York City.

Realizing their lack of experience in dealing with the issues that faced people seeking help at the settlement house, Mary and League leaders brought together experts on the Settlement Movement to provide lectures and instruction to Junior League members.  With better preparation came greater engagement leading to increased interest in membership by women notable in New York society; members would come to include Eleanor Roosevelt, Dorothy Whitney Straight and Ruth Draper.

As word of the work of the young Junior League women in New York spread, women throughout the country and beyond formed Junior Leagues in their communities.  In time, Leagues would expand their efforts beyond settlement house work to respond to the social, health and educational issues of their respective communities. In 1921, approximately 30 Leagues banded together to form the Association of Junior Leagues of America to provide support to one another. With the creation of the Association, it was Mary who insisted that although it was important for all Leagues to learn from one another and share best practices, each League was ultimately beholden to its respective community and should thus function to serve that community's needs.

As the 20th century progressed, more Junior Leagues were formed throughout the United States, Canada, Mexico and the United Kingdom.  Now known as the Association of Junior Leagues International Inc. (AJLI), the organization encompasses 292 member Leagues, with over 160,000 members committed to continuing the legacy established by its founder.

Consumer Advisory Board
In 1933, President Franklin D. Roosevelt appointed Mary to chair the Consumer Advisory Board (CAB) of the National Recovery Administration (NRA), the first government consumer rights group.

Despite her inexperience, Mary's work with farming cooperatives and belief in the power of cooperation would come to be her greatest asset.  Mary would promote the formation of consumer groups across the nation and encourage these groups to report their grievances to her office.

Mary Rumsey's legacy to New Deal reforms would be continued by her younger brother, W. Averell Harriman.  Averell was encouraged by his older sister to leave his finance job and join her and their friends, the Roosevelts, to advance the goals of the New Deal.  Averell joined the NRA, marking the beginning of his political career.

Personal life 
On May 27, 1910, Mary married sculptor and polo player Charles Cary Rumsey (1879–1922), shortly after the death of her father on September 9, 1909. Rumsey had been working at Arden House, creating one of the principal fireplace surrounds, as well as other decorative sculpture. By all accounts, the two had a happy marriage. Together they had a daughter and two sons.
Charles Harriman Rumsey (1911–2007)
Mary Averell Rumsey (b. 1913), who made her debut in 1932 at a party with over 1,100 guests.
Bronson Harriman Rumsey (1917–1939), who died when the plane he was riding in, along with Daniel S. Roosevelt (1917–1939) (the son of Hall Roosevelt and nephew of Eleanor Roosevelt), hit a mountain slope near Guadalupe Victoria, Puebla, Mexico.
Charles was killed in a car accident in 1922. From 1933-1934, she shared a home and possibly a romantic relationship with United States Secretary of Labor Frances Perkins. Both activists, they had been friends since 1918 and worked together in the Settlement Houses of New York City,  Mary died in 1934, a few weeks after being severely injured in horse riding accident during a hunt near Middleburg, Virginia.  Though the exact nature of their relationship is unknown, Perkins was with Rumsey's children at her bedside when she died, and was publicly recognized as one of the 'principal mourners' at her funeral.

References

Sources
 Nancy Beth Jackson, Ph.D. . The Junior League: 100 Years of Service. FRP. 2001.
 Janet Gordon & Diana Reische. The Volunteer Powerhouse. Rutledge Press. 1982.
 Association of Junior Leagues International: Legacy
 Association of Junior Leagues International: Notable Members
 Barnard Archives and Special Collections: Mary Harriman Rumsey 1905.

External links

1881 births
1934 deaths
Deaths by horse-riding accident in the United States
Barnard College alumni
Philanthropists from New York (state)
Consumer rights activists
New York (state) Democrats
Harriman family
American debutantes
Accidental deaths in Washington, D.C.
American women philanthropists
Activists from New York City
People from Brookville, New York
People from Middleburg, Virginia
Members of the Junior League